Jana Haas (born 20 September 1975) is a German swimmer. She competed in two events at the 1992 Summer Olympics.

References

External links
 

1975 births
Living people
German female swimmers
Olympic swimmers of Germany
Swimmers at the 1992 Summer Olympics
Sportspeople from Erfurt